Jönköping can mean:

Jönköping - a city in Sweden
Jönköping Municipality - a municipality in Sweden
Jönköping County - a county in Sweden